Martin Damm and Dominik Hrbatý were the defending champions but only Hrbatý competed that year with Jeff Tarango.

Hrbatý and Tarango lost in the first round to Mosé Navarra and Vincenzo Santopadre.

Wayne Ferreira and Yevgeny Kafelnikov won in the final 6–4, 7–6(8–6) against Daniel Nestor and Sandon Stolle.

Seeds

Draw

Final

Top half

Bottom half

External links
 2001 Rome Masters Men's Doubles Draw

Men's Doubles
Italian Open - Doubles